Election Day is a 1929 Our Gang short silent comedy film directed by Anthony Mack. It was the 81st Our Gang short that was released.

Cast

The Gang
 Joe Cobb as Joe Cobb
 Jackie Condon as Jackie
 Allen Hoskins as Farina
 Bobby Hutchins as Wheezer
 Mary Ann Jackson as Mary Ann
 Jay R. Smith as Jay R.
 Harry Spear as Harry
 Pete the Pup as himself

Additional cast
 Louise Beavers as Farina's mother
 Ed Brandenburg as man who slips on banana
 Baldwin Cooke as Gangster
 Dick Gilbert as Gangster
 Jack Hill as Gangster
 Ham Kinsey as man about town
 Gene Morgan as Officer
 Clarence Muse as Farina's father
 Retta Palmer as Lady in town

See also
 Our Gang filmography

References

External links

1929 films
1929 comedy films
1929 short films
American silent short films
American black-and-white films
Films directed by Robert A. McGowan
Metro-Goldwyn-Mayer short films
Our Gang films
1920s American films
Silent American comedy films
1920s English-language films